TruGreen, originally known as ChemLawn and briefly later as TruGreen ChemLawn, is the largest lawn treatment company in the United States. The company was founded in 1969 and provides lawn care and tree and shrub care treatments on a subscription basis. The treatments and services include weed killing, moss suppression, pesticides, aeration, overseeding, and fertilizing. The company does not offer lawn mowing service.
The TruGreen brand is also used for lawn services in Canada through a Mississauga, Ontario–based company named Greenlawn Ltd. that does business as TruGreen.

The company history includes several changes of ownership and the absorption of other lawn servicing operations including ChemGreen (originally founded in 1974) and Scotts LawnService (originally founded as Emerald Green Lawn Service before its purchase in 1997 by the Scotts Miracle-Gro Company).

History 
ChemLawn was founded in 1969 by Paul and Dick Duke in Troy, Ohio, and it became a large service provider in the 1970s. The Dukes had previously been sod farmers and had owned a gardening center.

The Dukes sold ChemLawn to Ecolab in 1987 for US$376 million, but Ecolab found it was unable to make the operation profitable, and it sold the business to ServiceMaster in 1992 for US$103 million. As part of ServiceMaster, the operational headquarters were moved to Memphis, Tennessee, where ServiceMaster was headquartered at the time and where TruGreen remains headquartered today.

A separate company called ChemGreen, considered to be the precursor to TruGreen, had been founded in 1974 in Michigan. ServiceMaster also bought ChemGreen, and rebranded the combination as "TruGreen ChemLawn" and then just as "TruGreen", trying to distance the brand from negative perceptions about the intensive use of chemicals and convey a greater sense of environmental responsibility.

TruGreen was then spun off as a separate company from ServiceMaster in January 2014. The private equity firm Clayton, Dubilier & Rice had majority ownership along with company management.

Another lawn servicing company, Emerald Green Lawn Service, had been purchased in 1997 by the Scotts Miracle-Gro Company and rebranded in 1998 as Scotts LawnService. In April 2016, Scotts LawnService was merged with TruGreen to operate as a joint venture, with Scotts Miracle-Gro Company retaining partial ownership. The Scotts branded operation continued to operate within TruGreen as a subsidiary for some period of time.

In 2019, Scotts Miracle-Gro sold its 30% minority stake in TruGreen for approximately $234 million. As of February 2023, the lawn servicing operation is marketed as TruGreen, with the Scotts brand basically retired from the lawn servicing business. The Scotts brand remains in use for consumer lawn, garden and pest control products sold by the Scotts Miracle-Gro Company, which is now an entirely separate company.

References

External links 

Agriculture companies established in 1969